Mighty Lights is a studio album by American jazz saxophonist Jane Ira Bloom. The album was released in 1983 by Enja label. The album also features Fred Hersch on piano, Charlie Haden on bass, and Ed Blackwell on drums.

Reception
AllMusic's Chris Kelsey wrote, " Bloom's control over the horn was occasionally dubious, but she evidenced an attractive tone and a coherent (if a bit immature and self-conscious) manner of phrasing. Her tunes were already quite sophisticated and distinctive, pointing to the even more ambitious composer into which she evolved. On the other hand, her band for this album will probably not be excelled for the rest of her career." Writers of Jazzwomen: Conversations with Twenty-one Musicians stated that the album "established her as a new voice to be reckoned with on the soprano saxophone."

Track listing

Personnel
Jane Ira Bloom – soprano saxophone
Fred Hersch – piano
Charlie Haden – bass
Ed Blackwell – drums

References

External links

1983 albums
Jane Ira Bloom albums
Enja Records albums